Oligodon catenata, the Assam kukri snake, is a species of snake.

Distribution:
India, Myanmar (= Burma), Vietnam, Cambodia, S China
eberhardti: Vietnam, Laos, Cambodia, China (Guangxi, Fujian)

References

 Blyth, Edward. 1855 Notices and descriptions of various reptiles, new or little known [part 2]. Jour. Asiatic Soc. Bengal, Calcutta, 23 (3): 287-302 [1854]
 Boulenger, George A. 1890 The Fauna of British India, Including Ceylon and Burma. Reptilia and Batrachia. Taylor & Francis, London, xviii, 541 pp.

External links
 http://itgmv1.fzk.de/www/itg/uetz/herp/photos/Oligodon_catenata1.jpg 
 http://itgmv1.fzk.de/www/itg/uetz/herp/photos/Oligodon_catenata2.jpg 
 http://itgmv1.fzk.de/www/itg/uetz/herp/photos/Oligodon_catenata3.jpg

catenata